The Siam Renaissance, known in Thai as Tawipop or Thawiphop, is a 2004 Thai historical fantasy film directed by Surapong Pinijkhar. It is the second film adaptation of the 1986 novel Thawiphop by Thommayanti. It stars Florence Vanida Faivre in her film acting debut as Maneechan, a contemporary young woman who is transported to Siam of the 19th century and witnesses the country's struggles against the colonial aspirations of Britain and France.

The film, produced by Film Bangkok, employed among the largest budgets for Thai films at the time, but was not financially successful. However, it has gained recognition as a major milestone in Thai cinema's developing trend of historical films and for its contribution to the discourse on Thai identity. It was included in the Thai Film Archive's inaugural list of national heritage films in 2011.

References

2004 films
Thai-language films
Film Bangkok films
Thai historical films
Films about time travel
Films based on Thai novels
Films based on works by Thommayanti
Thai national heritage films
History of Thailand in fiction